Dewald Pieters (born 21 March 1990) is a South African rugby union footballer. He plays mostly as a centre.

External links 

itsrugby.co.uk profile

Living people
1990 births
South African rugby union players
Rugby union centres
Rugby union players from Gauteng
Pumas (Currie Cup) players